The Palatine G 3/3 was a steam-driven, goods train, tank locomotive on the Palatinate network of the Royal Bavarian State Railways.

Description 

The four steam engines originally ordered for the ONCF in Morocco were procured in 1919 by Palatine Railways from the firm of Maffei. They stood out at that time because of their high boiler location and a high axle load. Two of these engines had steel fireboxes. As a result of their unusual design they could not be deployed with other engines which led, in 1924, to their early retirement, although they were incorporated by the Deutsche Reichsbahn in their first renumbering plan in 1923, being provisionally allocated operating numbers 53 501–504.

References 

G 03 3
Railway locomotives introduced in 1919
Maffei locomotives
Standard gauge locomotives of Germany
Freight locomotives
0-6-0T locomotives